(also  or) is a set of dietary laws dealing with the foods that Jewish people are permitted to eat and how those foods must be prepared according to Jewish law. Food that may be consumed is deemed kosher ( in English), from the Ashkenazic pronunciation (KUHsher) of the Hebrew , meaning "fit" (in this context: "fit for consumption").

 Only certain types of mammals, birds and fish meeting specific criteria are kosher; the consumption of the flesh of any animals that do not meet these criteria, such as pork, frogs, and shellfish, is forbidden.
 Meat and meat derivatives may never be mixed with milk and milk derivatives: separate equipment for the storage and preparation of meat-based and dairy-based foods must be used.

Every food that is considered kosher is also categorized as follows:
 "Meat" products (also called  or ) are those that contain kosher meat, such as beef, lamb or venison, kosher poultry such as chicken, goose, duck or turkey, or derivatives of meat, such as animal gelatin; non-animal products that were processed on equipment used for meat or meat-derived products must also be considered as meat
 "Dairy" products (also called  or ) contain milk or any derivatives such as butter or cheese; non-dairy products that were processed on equipment used for milk or milk-derived products must also be considered as milk
 Pareve products contain neither meat, milk nor their respective derivatives; they include foods such as fish, eggs from permitted birds, grains, produce and other edible vegetation. They remain pareve if they are not mixed with or processed using equipment that is used for any meat or dairy products.

While any produce that grows from the earth, such as fruits, grains, vegetables and mushrooms, is always permissible, laws regarding the status of certain agricultural produce, especially that grown in the Land of Israel, such as tithes and produce of the Sabbatical year, impact their permissibility for consumption.

Their details and practical application, however, are set down in the Oral Torah (eventually codified in the Mishnah and Talmud) and elaborated on in the later rabbinical literature. Although the Torah does not state the rationale for most  laws, some suggest that they are only tests of obedience, while others have suggested philosophical, practical and hygienic reasons.

This labeling is useful for many people, including those whose religions expect adherence to a similar set of dietary laws, people with allergies to dairy foods, or vegans, who use the various kosher designations to determine whether a food contains meat or dairy-derived ingredients.

And numerous scholarly and popular works exist on these topics,  covering both practice and theory.

Explanations

Philosophical
Jewish philosophy divides the 613 commandments (or ) into three groups—laws that have a rational explanation and would probably be enacted by most orderly societies, laws that are understood after being explained but would not be legislated without the Torah's command, and laws that do not have a rational explanation.

Some Jewish scholars say that  should be categorized as laws for which there is no particular explanation since the human mind is not always capable of understanding divine intentions. In this line of thinking, the dietary laws were given as a demonstration of God's authority, and man must obey without asking why. Although Maimonides concurs that all the statutes of the Torah are decrees, he is of the view that whenever possible, one should seek out reasons for the Torah's commandments.

The 1st-century BCE Letter of Aristeas argues that the laws "have been given [...] to awake pious thoughts and to form the character". This view reappears in the work of the 19th-century Rabbi Samson Raphael Hirsch.

The Torah prohibits "cooking the kid (goat, sheep, calf) in its mother's milk". While the Torah does not provide a reason, it has been suggested that the practice was perceived as cruel and insensitive.

Hasidic Judaism believes that everyday life is imbued with channels connecting with Divinity, the activation of which it sees as helping the Divine Presence to be drawn into the physical world; Hasidism argues that the food laws are related to the way such channels, termed 'sparks of holiness'
', interact with various animals. These 'sparks of holiness' are released whenever a Jew manipulates any object for a 'holy reason' (which includes eating); however, not all animal products are capable of releasing their 'sparks of holiness'. The Hasidic argument is that animals are imbued with signs that reveal the release of these sparks, and the signs are expressed in the biblical categorization of ritually 'clean' and ritually 'unclean'.

Medical
One of the earliest is that of Maimonides in The Guide for the Perplexed.

In 1953, David Macht, an Orthodox Jew and proponent of the theory of biblical scientific foresight, conducted toxicity experiments on many kinds of animals and fish. His experiment involved lupin seedlings being supplied with extracts from the meat of various animals; Macht reported that in 100% of cases, extracts from ritually 'unclean' meat inhibited the seedling's growth more than that from ritually 'clean' meats.

At the same time, these explanations are controversial. Scholar Lester L. Grabbe, writing in the Oxford Bible Commentary on Leviticus, says "[a]n explanation now almost universally rejected is that the laws in this section have hygiene as their basis. Although some of the laws of ritual purity roughly correspond to modern ideas of physical cleanliness, many of them have little to do with hygiene. For example, there is no evidence that the 'unclean' animals are intrinsically bad to eat or to be avoided in a Mediterranean climate, as is sometimes asserted."

Rules

Prohibited foods

The laws of  can be classified according to the origin of the prohibition (Biblical or rabbinical) and whether the prohibition concerns the food itself or a mixture of foods.

Biblically prohibited foods include:
 Non-kosher animals—any mammals without certain identifying characteristics (cloven hooves and rumination); any birds of prey; any fish without fins or scales (thus excluding catfish, for instance). All invertebrates are non-kosher apart from certain types of locust, on which most communities lack a clear tradition. No reptiles or amphibians are kosher.
This prohibition includes animals that have been slaughtered by non-Jews.
 Injured—an animal with a significant defect or injury, such as a fractured bone or particular types of lung adhesions.
 Blood—the blood of kosher mammals and fowl is removed through salting, with special procedures for the liver, which is very rich in blood.
 Particular fats—particular parts of the abdominal fat of cattle, goats and sheep must be removed by a process called .
 A limb of a living animal—according to Jewish law, God forbade Noah and his descendants to consume flesh torn from a live animal. Hence, Jewish law considers this prohibition applicable even to non-Jews, and therefore, a Jew may not give or sell such meat to a non-Jew.
 Fruit during the first three years—according to Leviticus 19:23, fruit from a tree in the first three years after planting may not be consumed (both in the Land of Israel and the diaspora). This applies also to the fruit of the vine—grapes, and wine produced from them.
 New grain—the Bible prohibits newly grown grain (planted after Passover the previous year) until the second day of Passover; there is debate as to whether this law applies to grain grown outside the Land of Israel.
 Wine of libation—wine that may have been dedicated to idolatrous practices.

Biblically prohibited mixtures include:
 Mixtures of meat and milk—this law derives from the broad interpretation of the commandment not to "cook a kid in its mother's milk"; other non-kosher foods are permitted for non-dietary use (e.g. to be sold to non-Jews), but Jews are forbidden to benefit from mixtures of meat and milk in any way.
 Different species of plants grown together—in the Land of Israel different species of plants are to be grown separately and not in close proximity according to Leviticus 19:19 and Deuteronomy 22:9–11.

Rabbinically prohibited foods include:
 Non-Jewish milk—milk that may have an admixture of milk from non-kosher animals (see below for current views on this prohibition).
 Non-Jewish cheese—cheese that may have been produced with non-kosher rennet.
 Non-Jewish wine—wine that while not produced for idolatrous purposes may otherwise have been poured for such a purpose or alternatively when consumed will lead to intermarriage.
 Food cooked by a non-Jew—this law was enacted for concerns of intermarriage. (Minor)
 Non-Jewish bread—this law was enacted for concerns of intermarriage.
 Health risk—certain foods and mixtures are considered a health risk, such as mixtures of fish and meat.

Permitted and forbidden animals

Only meat from particular species is permissible. Mammals that both chew their cud (ruminate) and have cloven hooves can be kosher. Animals with one characteristic but not the other (the camel, the hyrax, and the hare because they have no cloven hooves, and the pig because it does not ruminate) are specifically excluded.

In 2008, a rabbinical ruling determined that giraffes and their milk are eligible to be considered kosher. The giraffe has both split hooves and chews its cud, characteristics of animals considered kosher. Findings from 2008 show that giraffe milk curdles, meeting kosher standards. Although kosher, the giraffe is not slaughtered today because the process would be very costly. Giraffes are difficult to restrain, and their use for food could cause the species to become endangered.

Non-kosher birds are listed outright in the Torah, but the exact zoological references are disputed and some references refer to families of birds (24 are mentioned). The Mishnah refers to four signs provided by the sages. However, individual Jews are barred from merely applying these regulations alone; an established tradition is necessary to allow birds to be consumed, even if it can be substantiated that they meet all four criteria. The only exception to this is the turkey. There was a time when certain authorities considered the signs sufficient, so Jews started eating this bird without a  because it possesses all the signs in Hebrew.

Fish must have fins and scales to be kosher. Shellfish and other non-fish water fauna are not kosher. (See kosher species of fish.) Insects are not kosher, except for certain species of kosher locust. Any animal that eats other animals, whether they kill their food or eat carrion, is generally not kosher, as well as any animal that has been partially eaten by other animals.

Separation of meat and milk

Meat and milk (or derivatives) may not be mixed in the sense that meat and dairy products are not served at the same meal, served or cooked in the same utensils, or stored together.

Observant Jews have separate sets of dishes, and sometimes different kitchens, for meat and milk, and wait anywhere between one and six hours after eating meat before consuming milk products.

Shelomo Dov Goitein writes, "the dichotomy of the kitchen into a meat and a milk section, so basic in an observant Jewish household, is […] never mentioned in the Geniza." Goitein believed that in the early Middle Ages Jewish families kept only one set of cutlery and cooking ware. According to David C. Kraemer, the practice of keeping separate sets of dishes developed only in the late 14th and 15th centuries. It is possible observant Jews before then waited overnight for the meat or dairy gravy absorbed in a pot's walls to become insignificant before using the pot for the other foodstuff (meat or dairy).

Kosher slaughter

Mammals and fowl must be slaughtered by a trained individual (a ) using a special method of slaughter, .  slaughter severs the jugular vein, carotid artery, esophagus, and trachea in a single continuous cutting movement with an unserrated, sharp knife. Failure of any of these criteria renders the meat of the animal non-kosher.

The body of the slaughtered animal must be checked after slaughter to confirm that the animal had no medical condition or defect that would have caused it to die of its own accord within a year, which would make the meat unsuitable.

These conditions include 70 different categories of injuries, diseases, and abnormalities whose presence renders the animal non-kosher.

It is forbidden to consume certain parts of the animal, such as certain fats and the sciatic nerves from the legs, the process of excision being done by experts before the meat is sold.

As much blood as possible must be removed through the  process; this is usually done through soaking and salting the meat, but the liver, as it is rich in blood, is grilled over an open flame.

Fish (and kosher locusts, for those who follow the traditions permitting them) must be killed before being eaten, but no particular method has been specified in Jewish law. Legal aspects of ritual slaughter are governed not only by Jewish law but civil law as well.

Some believe that this ensures the animal dies instantly without unnecessary suffering, but many animal rights activists view the process as cruel, claiming that the animal may not lose consciousness immediately, and activists have called for it to be banned.

Preparation of meats
When an animal is ritually slaughtered the raw meat is traditionally cut, rinsed and salted, prior to cooking. Salting of raw meat draws out the blood that lodges on the inner surface of the meat. The salting is done with coarse grain salt, commonly referred to as kosher salt, after which the meat is laid over a grating or colander to allow for drainage, remaining so for the duration of time that it takes to walk one biblical mile (approximately 18–24 minutes). Afterwards, the residue of salt is rinsed away with water, and the meat cooked.

Meat that is roasted requires no prior salting, as fire causes a natural purging  of blood.

 ("Taz"), a 17th-century commentary on the Shulchan Arukh, ruled that the pieces of meat can be "very thick" when salting. The Yemenite Jewish practice, however, follows Saadiah Gaon, who required that the meat not be larger than half a "rotal" (i.e. roughly ) when salting. This allows the effects of the salt to penetrate.

This was believed to constrict the blood lodged within the meat, to prevent it from oozing out when the meat was eaten. The raw meat is left in the pot of boiling water for as long as it takes for the meat to whiten on its outer layer.

If someone wanted to use the water for soup after making  in the same pot, they could simply scoop out the film, froth and scum that surface in the boiling water.

 is not required when roasting meat over a fire, as the fire constricts the blood.

Kosher utensils

Utensils used for non-kosher foods become non-kosher, and make even otherwise kosher food prepared with them non-kosher.

Some such utensils, depending on the material they are made from, can be made suitable for preparing kosher food again by immersion in boiling water or by the application of a blowtorch.

Passover laws

This prohibition is derived from Exodus 12:15.

Utensils used in preparing and serving  are also forbidden on Passover unless they have been ritually cleansed.

Observant Jews often keep separate sets of meat and dairy utensils for Passover use only.

Produce of the Land of Israel
Biblical rules also control the use of agriculture produce, for example, with respect to their tithing, or when it is permitted to eat them or to harvest them, and what must be done to make them suitable for human consumption.

For example, many hold that the rule against eating  (new grain) before the 16th of the month Nisan does not apply outside the Land of Israel.

Vegetables

Vegetables such as spinach and cauliflower must be checked for insect infestation. The proper procedure for inspecting and cleaning varies by species, growing conditions, and views of individual rabbis.

Pareve foods

A pareve food is one which is neither meat nor dairy. Fish fall into this category, as well as any food that is not animal-derived. Eggs are also considered pareve despite being an animal product.

Some processes convert a meat- or dairy-derived product into a pareve one. For example, rennet is sometimes made from stomach linings, yet is acceptable for making kosher cheese. Gelatins derived from kosher animal sources (which were ritually slaughtered) are also pareve. Other gelatin-like products from non-animal sources such as agar agar and carrageenan are pareve by nature. Fish gelatin, like all kosher fish products, is pareve.

Jewish law generally requires that bread be kept parve (i.e., not kneaded with meat or dairy products nor made on meat or dairy equipment).

 has procedures by which equipment can be cleaned of its previous non-kosher or meat/dairy use, but those may be inadequate for vegetarians, those with allergies, or adherents to other religious laws.

For example, dairy manufacturing equipment can be cleaned well enough that the rabbis grant pareve status to products manufactured with it but someone with a strong allergic sensitivity to dairy products might still react to the dairy residue. This is why some products that are legitimately pareve carry "milk" warnings.

Cannabis

For cannabis grown in Israel, the plants must observe , but this does not apply to cannabis from elsewhere.

Tobacco

Although it is not a food product, some tobacco receives a year-long kosher for Passover certification. This year-long certification means that the tobacco is certified also for Passover where different restrictions may be in place. Tobacco may, for example, come into contact with some  grains that are strictly forbidden during Passover and the certification is a guarantee that it is free from this type of contamination.

In Israel, this certification is given by a private  rabbinic group Beit Yosef, but the Chief Rabbinate has objected to granting of any certification by rabbis because of health risks from tobacco.

Genetically modified foods
With the advent of genetic engineering, a whole new type of food has been brought into the world, and scholars in both academia and Judaic faith have differing viewpoints on whether these new strains of foods are to be considered kosher or not. The first genetically modified animal approved by the FDA for human consumption is the AquAdvantage salmon and, while salmon is normally an acceptably kosher food, this modified organism has a gene from a non-kosher organism.

In 2015, the Committee on Jewish Law and Standards of the Rabbinical Assembly released a document regarding genetically modified organisms, stating that modification of gene sequences via the introduction of foreign DNA in order to convey a specific capability in the new organism is allowable, that entirely new species should not be intentionally created, and that the health implications of genetically modified foods must be considered on an individual basis.

Some put forth that this intermixing of species is against the teachings of the Talmud and thus against Jewish Law and non-kosher.

Supervision and marketing

Hashgacha
Certain foods must be prepared in whole or in part by Jews. This includes grape wine, certain cooked foods (bishul akum), cheese (g'vinat akum), and according to some also butter (chem'at akum), dairy products (Hebrew: חלב ישראל chalav Yisrael "milk of Israel"), and bread (Pas Yisroel).

Product labeling standards

Although reading the label of food products can identify obviously non-kosher ingredients, some countries allow manufacturers to omit identification of certain ingredients. Such "hidden" ingredients may include lubricants and flavorings, among other additives; in some cases, for instance, the use of natural flavorings, these ingredients are more likely to be derived from non-kosher substances. Furthermore, certain products, such as fish, have a high rate of mislabeling, which may result in a non-kosher fish being sold in a package labeled as a species of kosher fish.

Producers of foods and food additives can contact Jewish religious authorities to have their products certified as kosher: this involves a visit to the manufacturing facilities by an individual rabbi or a committee from a rabbinic organization, who will inspect the production methods and contents and, if everything is sufficiently kosher a certificate would be issued.

Manufacturers sometimes identify the products that have received such certification by adding particular graphical symbols to the label. These symbols are known in Judaism as hechsherim. Due to differences in kashrut standards held by different organizations, the hechsheirim of certain Jewish authorities may at times be considered invalid by other Jewish authorities. The certification marks of the various rabbis and organisations are too numerous to list, but one of the most commonly used in the United States of America is that of the Union of Orthodox Congregations, who use a U inside a circle ("O-U"), symbolising the initials of Orthodox Union. In Britain, commonly used symbols are the "KLBD" logo of the London Beth Din and the "MK" logo of the Manchester Beth Din. A single K is sometimes used as a symbol for kosher, but since many countries do not allow letters to be trademarked (the method by which other symbols are protected from misuse), it only indicates that the company producing the product claims that it is kosher.

Many of the certification symbols are accompanied by additional letters or words to indicate the category of the product, according to Jewish law; the categorization may conflict with legal classifications, especially in the case of food that Jewish law regards as dairy, but legal classification does not.
 D—Dairy
 DE—Dairy equipment
 M—Meat, including poultry
Pareve—Food that is neither meat nor dairy
 Fish
 P—Passover-related (P is not used for Pareve)

In many cases constant supervision is required because, for various reasons such as changes in manufacturing processes, products that once were kosher may cease to be so. For example, a kosher lubricating oil may be replaced by one containing tallow, which many rabbinic authorities view as non-kosher. Such changes are often coordinated with the supervising rabbi or supervising organization to ensure that new packaging does not suggest any hechsher or kashrut. In some cases, however, existing stocks of pre-printed labels with the hechsher may continue to be used on the now non-kosher product. An active grapevine among the Jewish community discusses which products are now questionable, as well as products which have become kosher but whose labels have yet to carry the hechsher. Some newspapers and periodicals also discuss kashrut products.

Products labeled kosher-style are non-kosher products that have characteristics of kosher foods, such as all-beef hot dogs, or are flavored or prepared in a manner consistent with Ashkenazi practices, like dill pickles. The designation usually refers to delicatessen items.

History of kosher supervision and marketing

Food producers often look to expand their markets or marketing potential, and offering kosher food has become a way to do that. The uniqueness of kosher food was advertised as early as 1849. In 1911 Procter & Gamble became the first company to advertise one of their products, Crisco, as kosher. Over the next two decades, companies such as Lender's Bagels, Maxwell House, Manischewitz, and Empire evolved and gave the kosher market more shelf-space. In the 1960s, Hebrew National hotdogs launched a "we answer to a higher authority" campaign to appeal to Jews and non-Jews alike. From that point on, "kosher" became a symbol for both quality and value. The kosher market quickly expanded, and with it more opportunities for kosher products.

In 2014 the Israeli Defense Forces decided to allow female kosher supervisors to work in its kitchens on military bases, and the first women kosher inspectors were certified in Israel.

Legal usage

Advertising standards laws in many jurisdictions prohibit the use of the phrase kosher in a product's labeling unless the producer can show that the product conforms to Jewish dietary laws; however, different jurisdictions often define the legal qualifications for conforming to Jewish dietary laws differently. For example, in some places the law may require that a rabbi certify the kashrut nature, in others the rules of kosher are fully defined in law, and in others still it is sufficient that the manufacturer only believes that the product complies with Jewish dietary regulations. In several cases, laws restricting the use of the term kosher have later been determined to be illegal religious interference.

Costs
In the United States, the cost of certification for mass-produced items is typically minuscule and is usually more than offset by the advantages of being certified. In 1975 The New York Times estimated the cost per item for obtaining kosher certification at 6.5 millionths of a cent ($0.000000065) per item for a General Foods frozen-food item. According to a 2005 report by Burns & McDonnell, most U.S. national certifying agencies are non-profit, only charging for supervision and on-site work, for which the on-site supervisor "typically makes less per visit than an auto mechanic does per hour". However, re-engineering an existing manufacturing process can be costly. Certification usually leads to increased revenues by opening up additional markets to Jews who keep kosher, Muslims who keep halal, Seventh-day Adventists who keep the main laws of Kosher Diet, vegetarians, and the lactose-intolerant who wish to avoid dairy products (products that are reliably certified as pareve meet this criterion). The Orthodox Union, one of the largest kashrut organizations in the United States, claims that "when positioned next to a competing non-kosher brand, a kosher product will do better by 20%".

In some European Jewish communities, kosher supervision of meat includes a "tax" used to fund Jewish education in the community, which makes kosher meat more expensive than the cost of supervision alone would imply.

Society and culture

Adherence
Many Jews partially observe kashrut, by abstaining from pork or shellfish or by not drinking milk with meat dishes. Some keep kosher at home but eat in non-kosher restaurants. In 2012, one analysis of the specialty food market in North America estimated that only 15% of kosher consumers were Jewish. Kosher meat is regularly consumed by Muslims when halal is not available. Muslims, Hindus, and people with allergies to dairy foods often consider the kosher-pareve designation as an assurance that a food contains no animal-derived ingredients, including milk and all of its derivatives. However, since kosher-pareve foods may contain honey, eggs, or fish, vegans cannot rely on the certification.

About a sixth of American Jews or 0.3% of the American population fully keep kosher, and many more of them do not strictly follow all of the rules but still abstain from some prohibited foods (especially pork). The Seventh-day Adventist Church, a Christian denomination, preaches a health message which expects adherence to the kosher dietary laws.

Surveys conducted in 2013 and 2020 found that 22% of American Jews by religion claimed to keep kosher in their homes. Pork consumption in particular seems to be a bigger taboo than other non-Kosher eating practices among Jews; with 41% claiming to at least abstain from eating pork. American Jews are generally less strict about Kosher laws when compared to Israeli Jews. Nearly three times as many Israeli Jews reported that they commit to keeping kosher in their homes and 84% will not eat pork.

Linguistics

Etymology

In Ancient Hebrew the word kosher means be advantageous, proper, suitable, or succeed, according to the Brown–Driver–Briggs Hebrew and English Lexicon. In Modern Hebrew it generally refers to kashrut but it can also sometimes mean "proper". For example, the Babylonian Talmud uses kosher in the sense of "virtuous" when referring to Darius I as a "kosher king"; Darius, a Persian king (reigned 522–486 BCE), fostered the building of the Second Temple. In colloquial English, kosher often means "legitimate", "acceptable", "permissible", "genuine", or "authentic". The word kosher can also form part of some common product names.

Kosher salt
Sometimes kosher is used as an abbreviation of koshering, meaning the process for making something kosher; for example, kosher salt is a form of salt with irregularly shaped crystals, making it particularly suitable for preparing meat according to the rules of kashrut, because the increased surface area of the crystals absorbs blood more effectively. In this case the type of salt refers to kosher style salt. Salt may also be kosher certified salt, or both. Certified kosher salt follows kashrut guidelines. Sometimes the term "coarse kosher salt" is used to designate salt that is both kosher style and kosher certified. The term "fine kosher salt" is sometimes used for salt that is certified kosher but not kosher style.

Pickles
Kosher can occur as a synonym for Jewish tradition; for example, a kosher dill pickle is simply a pickle made in the traditional manner of Jewish New York City pickle-makers, using a generous addition of garlic to the brine, and is not necessarily compliant with the traditional Jewish food laws.

Suriname
A treef (Surinamese Dutch, derived from Sranan Tongo trefu) is a food taboo.
In Suriname certain groups of people have long adhered to belief in treef, especially among people of African descent. The consumption of certain foods is prohibited, in the belief that it could cause major diseases, particularly leprosy. These prohibitions can vary individually, but it is inextricably related to conditions in the family. A treef is inherited from the father's side, but it can be revealed in a dream, often by a woman. In addition, a woman must take into account special food taboos during pregnancy. There is great importance attached to the treef; if a child observes the treef of his father, and yet experiences a skin condition, this is seen as a strong indication that the child was begotten by the woman with another man. Finally treef also be acquired later in life by wearing certain charms that compel you to abstain from certain foods.

The word is derived from Hebrew, due to influence of Sephardi Jews who came to Suriname in the 17th century. This is also the source of Sranan kaseri 'ritually clean, kosher'.

Other uses
Although the term kosher relates mainly to food, it sometimes occurs in other contexts. Some Orthodox retailers sell kosher cell phones—stripped-down devices with limited features.

See also

 Abomination (Judaism)
 Ahimsa (non-violence to living beings)
 Buddhist cuisine
 Buddhist vegetarianism
 Christian dietary laws
 Comparison of Islamic and Jewish dietary laws
 Hindu dietary laws
 Islamic dietary laws
 Halāl
 Jewish cuisine
 Eco-Kashrut
 Israeli cuisine
 Jewish vegetarianism
 Jewish Veg
 Kosher certification agency
 Sabbath food preparation
 Jhatka
 Kosher
 Kosher tax
 Kosher tax conspiracy theory
 Taoist diet
 Treef
 Trefa banquet

References

Further reading

 
 
 Isaac Klein, A Guide to Jewish Religious Practice, JTSA, 1992
 David C. Kraemer, Jewish Eating and Identity Throughout the Ages, Routledge, 2008
 James M. Lebeau, The Jewish Dietary Laws: Sanctify Life, United Synagogue of Conservative Judaism, New York, 1983
 Yacov Lipschutz, Kashruth: A Comprehensive Background and Reference Guide to the Principles of Kashruth. New York: Mesorah Publications Ltd, 1989
 Jordan D. Rosenblum, The Jewish Dietary Laws in the Ancient World. Cambridge University Press, 2016.
 
 Guy Darshan, “Pork Consumption as an Identity Marker in Ancient Israel: The Textual Evidence,” Journal for the Study of Judaism 53,4-5 (2022)

External links

 Chabad.org: Kosher
 Kashrut.com
 OU Kosher 
 Aish.com: ABCs of Kosher 
 Jewfaq.org: Kashrut - Jewish Dietary Laws

 
Hebrew words and phrases in Jewish law
Ritual slaughter